Tea Sonja-Anastasia Villilä (born 16 April 1991) is a Finnish ice hockey defenseman, currently playing in the Naisten Liiga (NSML) with Kiekko-Espoo. She has previously played with the Finnish national team and won bronze with the team at the 2011 IIHF Women's World Championship.

International career
Villilä played with the Finnish national team at the 2014 Winter Olympics.

Villilä has also appeared for Finland at three IIHF Women's World Championships. Her first appearance came in 2011, where she won a bronze medal.

Villilä made one appearance for the Finland women's national under-18 ice hockey team, at the IIHF World Women's U18 Championships, in 2009.

Career statistics

Regular season and playoffs

International

References

External links

1991 births
Living people
People from Hyvinkää
Finnish women's ice hockey defencemen
Kiekko-Espoo Naiset players
Minnesota Duluth Bulldogs women's ice hockey players
HPK Kiekkonaiset players
Olympic ice hockey players of Finland
Ice hockey players at the 2014 Winter Olympics
Sportspeople from Uusimaa